Stuart Malcolm Tave (born April 10, 1923) is an American literary scholar.

Tave graduated from Columbia University, earned a master's degree at Harvard University, and completed a D. Phil at the University of Oxford. Tave taught at the University of Chicago, where he served as chair of the English department, dean of the Division of the Humanities, and William Rainey Harper Professor. He received a Quantrell Award for Excellence in Undergraduate Teaching from the institution in 1958, and was awarded a Guggenheim Fellowship in 1959. Upon his retirement in 1993, Tave was granted emeritus status. In 2000, the University of Chicago honored him as that year's Norman Maclean Award winner.

References

1923 births
Living people
Literary scholars
Alumni of the University of Oxford
Columbia University alumni
Harvard University alumni
University of Chicago faculty
20th-century American male writers
American expatriates in the United Kingdom